Koothappar is a panchayat town in Tiruchirappalli district in the Indian state of Tamil Nadu. It is located 16 km from Tiruchirappalli.

Geography
It lies close to Kaveri River and the famous Kallanai Dam (also known as the Grand Anicut) is just 5 km from here.

Demographics
 India census, Koothappar had a population of 17,061. Males constitute 50% of the population and females 50%. Koothappar has an average literacy rate of 87%, higher than the national average of 59.5%. Male literacy is 91%, and female literacy is 84%. In Koothappar, 7% of the population is under 6 years of age.

Transportation
Regular bus service connects the town with the intra-city terminal Chathiram Bus Station, Tiruchirappalli (also called as Main Guard Gate). The nearest railway station is Thiruverumbur and the nearby airport is Tiruchirapalli International Airport.

References

Cities and towns in Tiruchirappalli district